Doug Mankoff is a producer and executive producer of fifteen independent films including Thirteen Conversations About One Thing and The Big Empty. He is currently the CEO of Echo Lake Entertainment, a production and financing company he founded in 1997. He is also member of both the Academy of Motion Picture Arts and Sciences and the Producers Guild of America.

He is a graduate of St. Mark's School of Texas, Duke, and Harvard Business School. He also attended the master's program at NYU Film School.

References

External links
 

St. Mark's School (Texas) alumni
Duke University alumni
Harvard Business School alumni
Tisch School of the Arts alumni
American film producers
Living people
Year of birth missing (living people)
American chief executives